The GR 44 is a long-distance walking route of the Grande Randonnée network in France. The route connects Champerboux with Les Vans.

Along the way, the route passes through:
 Champerboux
 Col de Montmirat
 Mas-d'Orcières
 Villefort
 Chambonas
 Les Vans

References

Hiking trails in France